Newcastle-under-Lyme is a town and an unparished area in the district of Newcastle-under-Lyme, Staffordshire, England.  It contains 71 buildings that are recorded in the National Heritage List for England.  Of these, four are listed at Grade II*, the middle of the three grades, and the others are at Grade II, the lowest grade.  The list covers the town of Newcastle-under-Lyme, including suburbs such as Bradwell, Clayton, Porthill, and Wolstanton, and nearby villages including Apedale and Chesterton.  Most of the listed buildings are houses and cottages, farmhouses and farm buildings, shops, and offices.  The other listed buildings include churches and chapels, memorials in churchyards, the remains of a castle, public houses, a guildhall, a market cross, a former blast furnace, the base of a mine chimney, a former military barracks converted into workshops, items in a cemetery, a school, a milepost, and a statue of Queen Victoria.


Key

Buildings

Notes and references

Notes

Citations

Sources

Lists of listed buildings in Staffordshire
Newcastle-under-Lyme